Frederick John North (18891968) was a British geologist and museum curator.

He was a lifelong advocate and populariser of geology, and was from 191459 Keeper of Geology at the National Museum of Wales. He trained as a palaeontologist, specialising in fossil brachiopods; but from the 1920s, he wrote and spoke broadly about slate, coal, ironstone and limestone. He was a keen historian, cartographer, archaeologist, caver and photographer. He was a founder member of the British Association for History of Science.

Bibliography 
 1930: The River Scenery at the Head of the Vale of Neath, National Museum of Wales, Cardiff
 1937: Humphrey Lhuyd's maps of England and of Wales. National Museum of Wales, Cardiff.
 1949: Snowdonia (with B. Campbell and R. Scott). New Naturalist #13. Collins, London.

References 

1889 births
1968 deaths
20th-century British geologists
British cavers
New Naturalist writers
Welsh cartographers